Sunil Kumar Soni (born 28 November 1961) is an Indian politician. He was elected to the Lok Sabha, lower house of the Parliament of India from Raipur, Chhattisgarh in the 2019 Indian general election as member of the Bharatiya Janata Party.

References

External links
Official biographical sketch in Parliament of India website

India MPs 2019–present
Lok Sabha members from Chhattisgarh
Living people
1961 births